Jacques Charby (13 June 1929 – 1 January 2006) was a French actor, director, writer, and outspoken activist during against colonialism during the Algerian War. A member of the Réseau Jeanson or Jeanson network, he cooperated with Algeria's National Liberation Front in the fight for Algerian independence. He also wrote the first feature-length film chronicling Algerian Independence, entitled So Young a Peace, which was entered into the 4th Moscow International Film Festival.

Life and work
Charby was born Jacques Charbit in Paris.

References

External links

1929 births
2006 deaths
French Trotskyists
French film directors
Members of the National Liberation Front (Algeria)
Male actors from Paris
20th-century French male actors